Ryan Haddon (born April 17, 1971) is an American journalist, news presenter, and television producer.

Early life

Haddon is the daughter of businessman Glenn Souham and former model Dayle Haddon. She grew up in Toronto and Paris, and graduated from Boston University with a degree in communications.

Career
Haddon had a series of entertainment-based reporting jobs for various newspapers, magazines, and eventually television.

She has also worked at MacNeill/Lehrer NewsHour, on Roseanne Barr's talk show The Roseanne Show, and on Good Morning America. She has hosted the French television show Chronicles from California, NBC's Extra!, and Court TV's Hollywood Heat.

Personal life
In 1998, Haddon started dating actor Christian Slater. The couple married on February 12, 2000, and have two children, Jaden Christopher (1999) and Eliana Sophia (2001). They announced their separation over Christmas 2004, while Slater was performing in a stage play of One Flew Over the Cuckoo's Nest in London's West End. They officially separated in 2005 and divorced in November 2007.

On July 25, 2009, Haddon married actor Marc Blucas. They have since had two daughters.

References

External links
 

1971 births
American people of Canadian descent
American women journalists
Boston University College of Communication alumni
Living people
Journalists from Toronto
21st-century American women
Place of birth missing (living people)